The Branisko Tunnel is a road tunnel in eastern Slovakia. It is located on the D1 motorway at Beharovce - Fričovce section. It replaced the Branisko Pass road via mountain range of the same name, with the top at 751 m AMSL. Currently only one tube is open to traffic; the second tube is expected to be opened in the future.

Construction began when the exploration gallery driving was launched in April 1996 on the axle of the northern (left) tube. The southern tube driving started in May 1997 from both portals using New Austrian Tunnelling method (NATM). Works were slowed in 1999 due to cost cutting for motorway constructions. The breakthrough was made on May 1, 1999. The southern (right) tube of the tunnel with the Beharovce - Fričovce section was opened on June 29, 2003. 

The tunnel is 4975 m long. The road in the tunnel is 7.5 m wide, with 1 m wide sidewalks on both sides; maximum height is 4.5 m, maximum gradient is 1.2%. The maximum allowed speed in tunnel is 80 km/h.

References

External links
 Tunnel Branisko 
 Tunel Branisko 

Road tunnels in Slovakia
Tunnels completed in 1997